The Castlegar Apollos were a junior 'B' ice hockey team based in Castlegar, British Columbia, Canada. They were members of the Western Division of the Kootenay Hockey League (KHL) from 1967 to 1970 and members of the Western Division of the West Kootenay Hockey League (WKHL) in 1970 (now known as the Kootenay International Junior Hockey League (KIJHL)).

The Apollos joined the league in 1967 as an expansion team and folded in 1970.

History

After the Apollos folded in 1970, the Castlegar Rebels joined the Kootenay International Junior Hockey League (KIJHL) as an expansion team in 1976 until 1996, where they joined the Rocky Mountain Junior Hockey League (RMJHL) as a junior 'A' team, until 1998 where they once again joined the KIJHL, where they still currently play.

Season-by-season record

Note: GP = Games played, W = Wins, L = Losses, T = Ties, Pts = Points, GF = Goals for, GA = Goals against

Records as of December 13, 1970.

 Notes

 The Castlegar Apollos dropped out of the WKHL on December 13, 1970.

References

Ice hockey teams in British Columbia
Castlegar, British Columbia
1967 establishments in British Columbia
1970 disestablishments in British Columbia
Ice hockey clubs established in 1967
Ice hockey clubs disestablished in 1970